Joel Jiménez Portero (born 20 January 2000) is a Spanish footballer who plays as a goalkeeper for Real Unión, on loan from Sporting de Gijón.

Club career
Born in Avilés, Asturias, Jiménez joined Sporting de Gijón's Mareo from Avilés Deportivo CF. He was promoted to the reserves in Segunda División B ahead of the 2019–20 campaign, and made his senior debut on 20 October 2019, starting in a 0–1 home loss against Real Oviedo Vetusta.

A backup to Christian Joel, Jiménez became a first-choice for the B-side in the 2021–22 season, with the team now in Tercera División RFEF. He made his first team debut on 15 January 2022, coming on as an extra-time substitute for Diego Mariño in a 0–0 Copa del Rey home draw against Cádiz CF, as an attempt of manager David Gallego to use him on the penalty shoot-outs; Sporting was ultimately knocked out after Cádiz scored all penalties and won by 4–2.

On 9 August 2022, Jiménez was loaned to Primera Federación side Real Unión, for one year.

References

External links
 
 
 

2000 births
Living people
People from Avilés
Spanish footballers
Footballers from Asturias
Association football goalkeepers
Segunda División B players
Tercera Federación players
Sporting de Gijón B players
Sporting de Gijón players
Real Unión footballers